Karin Power (born 1982/83) is an American lawyer and Democratic politician who previously served in the Oregon House of Representatives. She represented the 41st district, which covers parts of Clackamas County and Multnomah County, including Milwaukie, Oak Grove, and parts of southeast Portland.

Early life and education
Power moved to Southeast Portland from Boston, Massachusetts in 2009 in order to attend Lewis & Clark Law School. She later moved to Milwaukie in October 2012, and was elected to the City Council in 2014.

Political career 
She won election to the House in 2016, defeating Republican candidate Timothy E. McMenamin with 71% of the vote.

In 2018 she ran unopposed, receiving 97.1% of the vote, however turnout in this election was lower than previous elections.

In 2020, she won the Democratic Primary unopposed with 99.32% of the vote (12,928). 88 individuals wrote in other names. In November 2020, she defeated Republican challenger and combat veteran Michael Newgard.

In February 2022, Power announced (along with fellow state Representatives Rachel Prusak and Anna Williams) that she would not seek reelection at the end of her current term ending in January 2023.

Power was succeeded by former Milwaukie mayor Mark Gamba.

Personal life
Power and her wife, Megan Elston, live in Milwaukie with their son, Grady.

References

External links
 Campaign website
 Legislative website

1980s births
Living people
Democratic Party members of the Oregon House of Representatives
Oregon city council members
LGBT state legislators in Oregon
LGBT people from Massachusetts
Politicians from Boston
People from Milwaukie, Oregon
21st-century American politicians
21st-century American women politicians
Women state legislators in Oregon
Lewis & Clark Law School alumni
Oregon lawyers
Lesbian politicians
Women city councillors in Oregon